Robert David Mwakosya (born 12 September 1952) is a Tanzanian boxer. He competed in the men's light welterweight event at the 1972 Summer Olympics.

References

External links
 

1952 births
Living people
Tanzanian male boxers
Olympic boxers of Tanzania
Boxers at the 1972 Summer Olympics
Place of birth missing (living people)
Light-welterweight boxers